In Greek mythology, Cobis was a prince of Colonae as son of King Cycnus and brother of Corianus, Glauce and possibly of Tenes and Hemithea.  After the death of their father, he and his siblings, Corianus and Glauce were presented as ransom of the people of Colonae though ransomed their city to the Achaean forces.

Notes

References 

 Dictys Cretensis, from The Trojan War. The Chronicles of Dictys of Crete and Dares the Phrygian translated by Richard McIlwaine Frazer, Jr. (1931-). Indiana University Press. 1966. Online version at the Topos Text Project.
 Pseudo-Apollodorus, The Library with an English Translation by Sir James George Frazer, F.B.A., F.R.S. in 2 Volumes, Cambridge, MA, Harvard University Press; London, William Heinemann Ltd. 1921. . Online version at the Perseus Digital Library. Greek text available from the same website.

Characters in Greek mythology